Municipal elections were held in Toronto, Ontario, Canada, on December 6, 1937. Ralph Day was elected mayor defeating incumbent William D. Robbins.

Toronto mayor

William D. Robbins had been appointed to the office of mayor a year and half previously. He was opposed by the much younger Controller Ralph Day. Day won by a significant margin, beating Robbins in all but two wards. Also running were fringe candidates Carlo Lamberti, a music teacher, and veteran Robert Harding.

Results
Ralph Day - 64,736
William D. Robbins - 50,779
Carlo Lamberti - 2,753
Robert Harding - 2,124

Board of Control
There was one opening on the Board of Control after Day chose to run for mayor. The race turned out to be a close contest between Alderman Douglas McNish and prominent communist Tim Buck with McNish winning by a few hundred votes. Further back was Alderman Robert Hood Saunders.

Results
Frederick J. Conboy (incumbent)  - 60,665
William J. Wadsworth (incumbent) - 53,766
Fred Hamilton (incumbent) - 47,493
Douglas McNish - 44,402
Tim Buck - 44,248
Robert Hood Saunders - 41,817
Robert Allen - 15,283
Harry Bradley - 4,623

City council

Ward 1 (Riverdale)
Frank M. Johnston (incumbent) - 6,717
Gordon Millen - 6,520
Robert Siberry - 6,272
Ernest Hewitt - 1,849
I.W. Malcolm - 1,500
John Francis Hughes - 1,035

Ward 2 (Cabbagetown and Rosedale)
Adelaide Plumptre (incumbent) - 3,894
Louis Shannon - 3,715
Joe Thompson - 2,198
George Harris - 1,735
George Kingston - 1,146
Alfred Gagne - 699
J.A.C. Cameron - 684
Bob King - 458
Norman Brown - 252
Frank Ward - 202

Ward 3 (Central Business District)
John S. Simmons (incumbent) - 3,786
Percy Quinn (incumbent) - 3,039
Jean Laing - 1,429
Lloyd Jaeger - 513

Ward 4 (Kensington Market and Garment District)
Nathan Phillips (incumbent) - 5,002
J.B. Salsberg  - 4,725
David A. Balfour - 3,172
Hyman Langer - 1,967
Joseph Stewart - 1,211

Ward 5 (Trinity-Bellwoods
Stewart Smith (incumbent) - 8,025
Ernest Bogart (incumbent) - 7,572
C.M. Carrie - 6,736
Jacob Romer - 1,493
Frederick Cottrell - 615

Ward 6 (Davenport and Parkdale)
D.C. MacGregor (incumbent) - 8,596
George Grannell (incumbent)  - 6,339
William V. Muir - 6,253
Neil Cameron - 5,271
Pat McKeown - 1,649
Alan Dignan - 1,514
William Haysey - 1,417
Chester Sherlock - 1,184
William Logie - 717
Bertram Tipping - 656

Ward 7 (West Toronto Junction)
George H. Gardiner (incumbent) - 4,885
Charles Rowntree - 8,901
Frank Whetter (incumbent) - 3,432
Minerva Reid - 3,318

Ward 8 (The Beaches)
Walter Howell (incumbent) - 8,316
Ernest Bray (incumbent) - 7,388
Edmund Guest - 6,627
Ernest Woollon - 4,266
Gifford Baker - 1,168

Ward 9 (North Toronto)
William Croft (incumbent) - 7,699
William D. Ellis (incumbent) - 7,453
John Innes - 7,183

Results taken from the December 7, 1937 Toronto Star and might not exactly match final tallies.

References
Election Coverage. Toronto Star. December 7, 1937

1937 elections in Canada
1937
1937 in Ontario